Matthew T. "Matt" Quinn is an American retired military officer and government official who is the current Under Secretary of Veterans Affairs for Memorial Affairs in the Biden administration.

Education 
Quinn earned a Bachelor of Science degree in electrical engineering from Montana State University, a Master of Business Administration from the University of Montana, and a Master of Strategic Studies from the United States Army War College.

Career 
During his career, Quinn has served in the United States Army and Army National Guard. From April 2012 to January 2021, Quinn was the 27th adjutant general of Montana, serving as commander of the Montana National Guard and director of the Montana Department of Military Affairs. On April 9, 2021, President Joe Biden announced his intent to nominate Quinn to be the Under Secretary of Veterans Affairs for Memorial Affairs. On April 19, 2021, his nomination was sent to the Senate. His nomination was reported out of the Senate Committee on Veterans' Affairs, and confirmed by the full Senate on June 17, 2021. He was sworn into office on June 23, 2021 by Secretary Denis McDonough.

References 

Living people
Montana State University alumni
University of Montana alumni
United States Army War College alumni
Year of birth missing (living people)
Place of birth missing (living people)
United States Army generals
National Guard (United States) generals
Military personnel from Montana
State cabinet secretaries of Montana
Biden administration personnel
United States Department of Veterans Affairs officials